Orrin Richard Bundy (born June 19, 1948) is an American music academic.

Bundy was the Director of Penn State Athletic Bands, most notably the Penn State Blue Band. He originally joined the University Park faculty of The Pennsylvania State University in 1982 as a graduate assistant, then became Assistant Director of the Blue Band in 1988, before becoming Director in 1996. In addition to his role as Director, he teaches courses in conducting, marching band techniques, instrumental music education, and band literature. He retired as director in 2015.

The only Blue Band director to have also been a member of the marching Blue Band as an undergraduate, Bundy was in the Blue Band during his four years in college from 1966–1970. Upon graduation in 1970, Bundy enlisted in the United States Army and served as a trombonist with the United States Continental Army Band. After completing his tour of duty with the military, Bundy became band director/instrumental music instructor in 1976 for the Iroquois School District, Erie, Pennsylvania. Bundy then went on to receive his master's degree from The University of Michigan before he returned to Penn State for his doctoral degree.

An active guest conductor and adjudicator, Bundy has conducted ensembles and presented clinics throughout the United States and Canada. He is a member of the College Band Directors National Association (CBDNA), Music Educators National Conference, Pennsylvania Music Educators Association, Phi Beta Mu, and Phi Mu Alpha Sinfonia. He is a past president of the Eastern Division of CBDNA and Phi Beta Mu, Nu chapter. From 2005–2007, Bundy partnered with fellow Penn State faculty member and sports enthusiast Jon Nese on the popular radio program Let's Talk Penn State.  Bundy received Penn State's College of Arts & Architecture Alumni Achievement Award in 2000.

Bundy has overseen a number of significant milestones in the history of the Blue Band, such as the emergence of ABBA (Alumni Blue Band Association) which has grown to become the largest Alumni Affiliate Group (AAG) in the Penn State Alumni Association, an expansion in the size of the band, construction of the Blue Band Building, and receipt of the prestigious Sudler Trophy in 2005. The Blue Band Building was renamed in his honor upon his retirement in 2015.

Bundy's wife, Chris, is an employee of Penn State, and they have four children.

References

Pennsylvania State University alumni
Pennsylvania State University faculty
Living people
1948 births
University of Michigan alumni